This article describes the qualification for the 2016 European Men's Handball Championship.

Qualification system
38 teams have registered for participation. 38 teams competed for 15 places at the final tournament in 2 distinct Qualification Phases. In each phase, the teams were divided into several pots according to their positions in the EHF National Team Ranking.

Qualification Phase 1
The draw for the qualification round was held on the 23 June 2012 at the EHF Congress, in Monte Carlo, Monaco.
The games were played in a home and away series, with every team playing each other twice. The group winners advanced to the second phase.

Seeding

Group 1

Group 2

Group 3

Play-off

Seeding
The draw for phase 2 was held on the 27 June 2013, in Vienna, Austria. The three lowest ranked teams of the 2014 qualification are seeded in Pot 1 while the three group winners of Phase 1 are seeded in Pot 2.

Matches

First leg

Second leg

Switzerland won 65–58 on aggregate.

Finland won 62–61 on aggregate.

Bosnia and Herzegovina won 55–45 on aggregate.

Qualification Phase 2
The draw was held on 11 April 2014. The teams were split into seven groups of four teams. The top two ranked teams from each group and the best third ranked team qualified for the final tournament.

Seeding

Group 1

Group 2

Group 3

Group 4

Group 5

Group 6

Group 7

References

External links
 Eurohandball Site

Qualification
Europe Men's Championship qualification
Europe Men's Championship qualification
Europe Men's Championship qualification
Europe Men's Championship qualification
Qualification for handball competitions